Hema Malini - Diva Unveiled is a biographical book about Bollywood actress Hema Malini, written by film journalist Ram Kamal Mukherjee in 2005. Mukherjee wrote it while he was working as a senior correspondent for Stardust. The book was released by Magna Publishing Co. Ltd., owned by media baron Nari Hira. The foreword of the book was written by Amitabh Bachchan.

The book is not an authorized biography of Hema Malini, but she appeared at book launch events in Delhi and Kolkata.

Award
In 2006, Ram Kamal Mukherjee won the Best Author award at the Kalakar Awards in Kolkata.

References

Indian biographies
Biographies about actors
2005 non-fiction books
21st-century Indian books